Eisenzicken (Hungarian: Németciklény, Vasverőszék or Vasszék, Croatian: Nimski Cikljin) is a small community in Burgenland, Austria that belongs to the neighbouring village of Unterwart (Hun.: Alsóőr). It had a population of 240 in 2001.

History
Eisenzicken was first mentioned in 1352 under the name "Wosuereuzek" and 1496 "Vasek". The old Hungarian name of the settlement proves that Vasverőszék was originally established as a community of iron ore workers. The village already had a church in 1368. Vasverőszék in the Middle Ages was part of the Upper Őrség microregion and the villagers were Hungarian frontier guards (őr) of the border-zone (gyepű) similarly than the people of Felsőőr (today Oberwart) and Alsóőr (today Unterwart).

In the 15th century the village was depopulated because of the constant skirmishes with Austria. The Baumkircher family settled German peasants in the village. The name of the settlement changed to Eisenzicken or Német-Cziklin (the later first mentioned in 1640 as "Nemet Chiklin")

Németciklény (Eisenzicken) belonged to the old county of Vas until 1921 and it was part of the Kingdom of Hungary. The village had 53 houses in 1857/58. Surnames indicate that the total population was German that time. According to the last Hungarian census in 1910 the population numbered 358 people (almost exclusively German).

After the Treaty of Trianon it became part of the Republic of Austria. Eisenzicken was merged with the neighbouring Hungarian village of Unterwart/Alsóőr in 1971. The small community retained its agricultural way of life until the present.

Sight
The small baroque Roman Catholic Church of St. Fabian and Sebastian is a filial of the church of Rotenturm an der Pinka. There are several old peasant houses in the village giving it a distinct rural feel.

Cities and towns in Oberwart District